Ptomaphagus nevadicus is a species of small carrion beetle in the family Leiodidae. It is found in Central America and North America.

References

Further reading

 
 
 

Leiodidae
Articles created by Qbugbot
Beetles described in 1880